G1-a is  one of the subsidiary pyramids of the Giza East Field of the Giza Necropolis, located immediately to the eastern side of the Great Pyramid of Giza. It was  built during the Fourth Dynasty of Egypt. In the west wall of the burial chamber a small niche was dug in which were found fragments of basalt. It is also known as the Pyramid of Hetepheres I as discovered by Mark Lehner; it was originally thought to belong to Queen Meritites I.

References

Giza Plateau
Pyramids of the Fourth Dynasty of Egypt

See also
Pyramid G1-b
Pyramid G1-c
Pyramid G1-d
 List of Egyptian pyramids